Tubefilter, Inc. is a privately held company based in Los Angeles, California that operates media businesses focusing on the online entertainment industry. Tubefilter is best known for Tubefilter News, a blog targeted at the fans, creators, producers, influencers, and distributors of streaming television and web series content.

Cited by
Tubefilter News has been cited by Variety, and its staff have been quoted by the Washington Post, the Christian Science Monitor, The Wrap, and BusinessWeek, when covering the streaming television industry. It is ranked in the top 1,600 blogs worldwide according to Technorati.

Other operations
The company also operates and hosts the Streamy Awards, a weekly streaming television guide, and monthly web series meetups. In October 2009, Tubefilter acquired online entertainment and reviews site Tilzy.tv.

Network 
Tubefilter offers blogs and services on its network including:
 Tubefilter News (launched June 2008), a trade publication for the online entertainment industry.
 Tubefilter Jobs (launched February 2009), a new-media and streaming television focused job board.
 Web TV Schedule (launched August 2008), a guide to streaming television release schedules.

Events 
Tubefilter operates a series of events in Los Angeles and New York. These include:
 Onfronts (launched June 2009), a bi-annual digital upfront for the streaming television industry.
 Web TV Meetups (launched August 2008), a community event series in Los Angeles.
 Web TV Week (launched March 2009), a week-long series of streaming television events that takes place every spring and fall in Los Angeles.

Programs and sponsorships 
Tubefilter sponsors and promotes a number of streaming television-based award shows and foundations. They are a founding host of the Streamy Awards. They were also one of the founding media companies that formed the International Academy of Web Television.

References

External links 
 
 Tubefilter News

Streaming television
Companies based in Los Angeles
Mass media companies established in 2008
Privately held companies based in California
Online mass media companies of the United States
Mass media about Internet culture
Websites about digital media
2008 establishments in California